Albert Francis "Bert" Dingley (August 21, 1885 – April 7, 1966) was an American racecar driver.  Having started his career on the West Coast by 1904, Dingley appeared in a couple of Vanderbilt Cup races and suffered serious injuries at Tacoma in 1914.

1909 AAA national championship
After being selected in 1909 as the "driver of the year" by American automotive journal Motor Age, he was also listed as the 1909 national champion by the AAA Contest Board after championship results were retrospectively calculated in 1927.  However, when results were being revisited in 1951 and winners were retroactively awarded for the 1902 to 1908 championships, Dingley was stripped of the 1909 championship, which was instead awarded to George Robertson.

Death
Dingley died in a nursing home in Beech Grove, Indiana on April 7, 1966, aged 80.

Indianapolis 500 results

References

External links
 

1885 births
1966 deaths
People from Oakdale, California
Racing drivers from California
Indianapolis 500 drivers
AAA Championship Car drivers